Noureddin Kianouri (1915–1999) was an Iranian construction engineer, Urban planner Professor of Bauakademie der DDR in Berlin  and a communist political leader. He studied first at University of Tehran until 1934 and later in Germany from 1934 to 1939. Before his return to Iran he practiced architecture as well though he is mostly remembered as a construction engineer in Munich office of Philipp Holzmann. About a year after foundation of Tudeh Party he joined the party with the membership number 444 on May 1942. Later he became one of the influential members of the Central Committee for the communist Tudeh Party,  Following the 1953 Iranian coup d'état the party was banned and Kianouri was imprisoned. He fled, and lived in Italy and later East Germany; under the pseudonym "Dr. Silvio Macetti" he was an influential architect and theorist of socialist architecture and city planning.

After his second return to Iran following the 1979 Islamic Revolution, he continued his political activities and acted as the Tudeh party's general secretary from 1979 to 1984. Again he came under scrutiny, and again the party was banned. Kianouri was arrested and tortured (and so was his wife), and read a forced confession on national TV. He was released and placed under house arrest, and died on 5 November 1999.

History

Family and education
Kianouri was born into the Iranian upper class. His grandfather was Sheikh Fazlollah Noori, a conservative politician who was executed in 1909; his father, on the other hand, had fought on the side of the constitutional revolutionaries. After attending the University of Tehran, he was trained in Germany, and graduated from the University of Aachen in 1939. His thesis was on the Healthcare & Hospital Constructions in Iran.

First return to Iran
In the early 1940s he married feminist and communist activist Maryam Firouz; at the time he taught structure at Tehran University. Throughout the period he had an active political and professional life, and was one of the few educated Iranian construction engineers and architects in 1940's. He was one of the first members of the Association of Iranian Architects (1945), which was placed in charge of major housing developments in the city of Tehran. The Association put in place the guidelines of the Congrès Internationaux d'Architecture Moderne, and translated them into "building codes, regulations, and protocols that had the fundamental role in shaping the Middle East's first modern metropolis". Kianouri was described as a "key figure", who formulated the organization's theoretical and ideological mission statements.

On the political side, he joined the Tudeh Party in 1942 about a year after its foundation, and was a member of the Tudeh Party's central committee in 1945, one of the party's "key figures".

Assassination accusations, escape from prison, exile

In February 1949, Kianouri along with other party members were accused of having planned an assassination attempt on Mohammad Reza Pahlavi, the Shah. Later it came to light that Kianouri was aware of the assassination but had not reported the attempt to the central committee. He was sentenced to ten years (his wife was sentence, in absentia, to death). He spent two years in jail and then escaped, seeking exile in Italy where, with the help of the Italian Communist Party, he received a new identity as Dr. Silvio Macetti, professor of architecture.

He remained active in the Iranian communist party, from abroad. He was one of the "hard liners" in the party, who formed a more dogmatically Marxist faction compared to the moderates, and this faction generally opposed Mohammad Mosaddegh's government. By 1952 the moderates had gained the upper hand and the party did not stockpile any weapons, lest it be seen as hostile to Mosaddegh (according to Kianouri); the party was caught flat-footed when Mosaddegh was overthrown in the CIA and MI6-sponsored 1953 Iranian coup d'état.

In 1955 two years after the coup 1953 Kianouri ran away from Iran to Iraq and further to Italy. later 1956 with the new name Silvio Macetti moved to Moscow and one year later to East Germany. In the Soviet Union and East Germany more than others he worked with Josef Kaiser, Bruno Flierl and Georgy A. Gradov (Градов, Георгий Александрович), also an architect and an urban planner. He also collaborated with German architect and city planner Bruno Flierl, furthering the work of Gradov. In 1968 he published Großwohneinheiten, which included the strip building as a solution for mass residential construction. A few years later, Gradov published Stadt und Lebensweise (1971). The two never finalized the research project they worked on for decades, and many of the manuscripts proposals were never published. According to Hamed Khosravi, it is not easy to assess how much practical impact their theoretical work had, but it was clear what the essence of the work was: "For Macetti the key to make any social and political change in the society lied in the question of domestic space", less about fulfilling individual necessities, desires, and needs", and more about "the collective mobilization of those lives through maximization of the communal facilities and minimization of the living units to the bare essential infrastructures."

Kianouri and his wife were tried in absentia by the regime of Mohammad-Rezā Shāh Pahlavi and sentenced to hard labour for life.  As a research director of Bauakademie der DDR in Berlin, he designed a new model for high-rise buildings in accordance with socialist urban development concepts differing from East Germany's Plattenbau concept. His architectural and urban planning designs (GroßWohnEinheiten) were later used as the basis of urban planning in the People's Republic of China. He stayed in East Berlin until 1977, when he was selected as the Secretary General of the Iranian Communist Party.

Second return to Iran
The couple returned to Iran following the Iranian Revolution of 1979. The Tudeh party was reinstated, and in January 1979, the party's First Secretary Iraj Eskandari was replaced by Kianouri, and for a short period of time the party remained legal; his wife led the Democratic Organization of Iranian Women. The party at that time supported the Iranian Revolution. Kianouri, interviewed for Newsweek, expressed the party's view that it should work with Ruhollah Khomeini, and that "he is playing a totally progressive part in the development of Iran".

Arrest, forced confession, house arrest, and death
In 1982 the Iranian regime received a list of alleged Soviet agents supplied by KGB defector Vladimir Kuzichkin (who had been the Soviet contact for the Tudeh Party) from MI6 and the CIA, possibly so the British could find favor with the Iranian regime. The British also found the repression of the communist party in Iran to be useful. A series of mass arrests followed, including that of Kianouri and his wife; the Tudeh Party was again banned, accused of espionage for the Soviet Union. In February 1983, Kianouri and his wife were imprisoned and later forced to publicly confess on a televised broadcast at the height of the persecution of communists in Iran.

The public confession happened in May 1983, when Kianouri and Behazin, a well-known writer and translator and member of the Tudeh party, appeared on national television, each giving a recantation that was a kind of "history lesson", in which they outlined how communism had betrayed the people of Iran. Kianouri mentioned how he had come to realize that communism was essentially alien to the people of Iran, and that the party was plagued by private jealousies and corruption. Throughout his presentation he kept his hands under the table: it had been broken during interrogation. (In 1995, he testified to the United Nations Human Rights Commission, denouncing "the torture and other inhumane practices carried out in the Islamic Republic's prisons".) His wife, who had fallen ill during solitary confinement, was released on medical ground and placed under house arrest; he joined her a year later, on the condition that he remain quiet to the media. Later, "in an open letter to Khomeini, Kianouri recorded a horrific catalogue of maltreatment and tortures meted out to him and his wife during their imprisonment". He died in 1999.

Bibliography

Some Architecture articles & -books of Noureddin Kianouri in Persian Language 
 1946, Reconstruction of Buildings in Soviet-Union. "Tajdid Sakhteman-haye Kharab Shode dar Etehad Jamahir Shoravi" Arshitekt, 1(2), 58–63. Tehran" (Реконструкция зданий в Советском Союзе После второй мировой войны 1941–44) 
 1950, Buildings of "Health and Care" Noureddin Kianouri Tehran.

Some Architecture articles & -books of Noureddin Kianouri in German and Russian Language (Noureddin Kianouri Wrote under a Pseudonym of Silvio Macetti N. K.)
 1338, Krankenhausbau für Iran, Der heutige Stand und die Neuordnung der Volksgesundheits-und Kranken-Fürsorge in Iran.
 1961, "Forschungskomplex zur »Herausbildung sozialistischer Wohnverhältnisse und zur Entwicklung des Lebensraumes im entwickelten gesellschaftlichen System des Sozialismus" FDJ-Wettbewerb "Haus der Zukunft" (1961) Bruno Flierl und "Silvio Macetti" (Noureddin Kianouri), Free German Youth Architectural design competition "Future house" (1961).
 1964 (1964) Das industrielle Bauen und die Gestaltung der Fassade, Erfahrungen aus dem Ausland, Noureddin Kianouri Under A Pseudonym of Dr. Ing. Silvio Macetti 7/1964 Deutsche Architektur VEB Verlag für Bauwesen Berlin(N.K.).
 1965, "Grosswohneinheiten-Article" 10/1965 Deutsche Architektur VEB Verlag für Bauwesen Berlin, 1965, "Noureddin Kianouri" under codename Dr. "Silvio Macetti".
 1966, Artikle "Bemerkungen zu dem Beitrag, Grosswohneinheiten" von Noureddin Kianouri under codename "Dr. Macetti" [Diskussionsbeitrag], in 18. Plenartagung der Deutsche Bauakademie Berlin Deutsche Architecture 1966, S. 79–81.
 1966, Zeit und Raum – Entscheidende Faktoren der künftigen Entwicklung der sozialistischen Architektur.In: Deutsche Architektur (1966), H. 1, S. 10–11, Noureddin Kianouri Under A Pseudonym of Dr. Ing. Silvio Macetti .
 1967, "Konzeption NK — ein Vorschlag für den industriellen Wohnungsbau" Noureddin Kianouri under codename "Silvio Macetti" Deutsche Architektur 3/1967,.
 1956-1966, "Großwohneinheiten" Noureddin Kianouri Under A Pseudonym of "Macetti,Silvio. N.K." VEB für Bauwesen.
 1968, "Wohnhochhäuser" Noureddin Kianouri under codename "Macetti, Silvio" Zeitschrift Deutsche Architektur 8/1968.
 1968, "Probleme des Wohnungsbaus" Noureddin Kianouri under codename "Macetti, Silvio" Zeitschrift Deutsche Architektur 10/1968.
 1968, "Berlinerinnen Und Berliner Wohnen wir nur in der Wohnung?" Noureddin Kianouri under codename "Macetti, Silvio" Zeitschrift ND Neues Deutschland Neues Deutschland Organ Des Zentral Kommititees der Sozialistischen Einheitpartei Deutschland 10/1968.
 1968, Bruno Flierl Zusammen mit Silvio Macetti. Bemerkungen zu dem Buch „Stadt und Lebensweise“ von G.A. Gradow(Moskau). 12. September 1968 1968/13.
 1969, "Ein Aktuelles Problem-Grosswohneinheiten" Deutsche Architektur Band 18 ausgabe 7-12 Deutsche Bauakademie, Bund Deutsche Architekten, original von: Pennsylvania State University digitalisiert 21.sep.2010. "Noureddin Kianouri" under codename Dr. "Silvio Macetti".
 1969, Vgl. BArch, DY 34/10771, Bundesvorstand des FDGB Free German Trade Union Federation– Abteilung Sozialpolitik, Gewerkschaftliche Sozialpolitik, Arbeits- und Lebensbedingungen, Wohnungsbau und Verteilung des Wohnraums: Grundsätzlicher Standpunkt der Gewerkschaften zu den perspektivischen und prognostischen wohnungspolitischen Aufgaben zur weiteren Entwicklung sozialistischer Wohnbedingungen. Thema 7 des Forschungsplanes des Bundesvorstandes des FDGB, Februar 1969, 173 Seiten, darin: Silvio Macetti, Standpunkt der Gewerkschaften zur Herausbildung sozialistischer Wohnverhältnisse und zur Entwicklung des Lebensraumes im entwickelten gesellschaftlichen System des Sozialismus, S. 41–90.
 1970, "Die weitere Entwicklung der sozialistischen Lebensweise und das Problem des städtischen Personenverkehrs" Noureddin Kianouri under codename "Silvio Macetti" Deutsche Architectur Juli 1970.
 1970, Sozialistische Architektur kontra Konvergenztheorie, Heinz Heuer. Umfrage: Perspektiven der sozialistischen Architektur, Edmund Collein u. a. Bernhard Geyer, Noureddin Kianouri under codname Dr. Silvio Macetti, Otto Patze Helmut Trauzettel. Zeitschrift Deutsche Architektur 8/1970.
 1971, Ökonomie der Stadt und komplexe Ökonomie des Städtebaus, "Noureddin Kianouri" under codename Dr. "Silvio Macetti" Zeitschrift Deutsche Architektur 10/1971, .
 1971, Сильвио Масетти - Крупные жилые комплексы Издание: Издательство литературы по строительству, Москва, 1971 Объем: 185 стр.
 1972, Wo steht mein Bett im Jahre 2000? "Noureddin Kianouri" under codename Dr. "Silvio Macetti" Zeitschrift "form+Zweck", .
 1972, Ökonomie der Freizeit und Stadtgestalt — Silvio Macetti (Berlin).
 1968-1978 "Skizze einer Problemstellung für die Ausarbeitung einer Wissenschaftlichen Prognose der entscheidenden Entwicklungstendenzen des Städtbaus und der Architektur bis zum Jahre 2000 und darüber hinaus, Deutsche Bauakademie zu Berlin, Wissenschafliche Direktion, Abteilung Prognose (unv. Mat.)", "Noureddin Kianouri" under codename Dr. "Silvio Macetti".
 1979, "Die komplexe Ökonomie der baulich-räumlichen Umwelt" Noureddin Kianouri under codename Dr. "Silvio Macetti", DH2/21675 Bundes Archive.

Some Architecture articles & -books about Noureddin Kianouri

References

1915 births
1999 deaths
First Secretaries of Tudeh Party of Iran
Iranian revolutionaries
Iranian people convicted of spying for the Soviet Union
Iranian expatriates in East Germany
Central Committee of the Tudeh Party of Iran members
Second Secretaries of Tudeh Party of Iran
RWTH Aachen University alumni
Iranian architects
People who have been placed under house arrest in Iran
Escapees from Iranian detention
People from Nur, Iran